Mel Johnson Jr. is an American character actor and film producer from Long Island City, Queens, in New York City.

Biography
Johnson portrays the mutant cab driver and Mars secret agent Benny in the 1990 hit science fiction film Total Recall. He also starred in the Broadway musical On the Twentieth Century and appeared in the Public Theater's "Shakespeare in the Park" 2005 revival of Two Gentlemen of Verona. He was also in the musical The Rink.

Johnson played Broca, the Cardassian who succeeds Damar in becoming the leader of the Cardassian Union in Star Trek: Deep Space Nines final two episodes, "The Dogs of War" and "What You Leave Behind". Johnson has also guest starred in The Munsters Today, The Fresh Prince of Bel-Air and The Practice. His other motion picture credits include Off the Mark, American Blue Note, Murder By Numbers, Hideous!, Archibald the Rainbow Painter and In the Shadow of the Cobra.

Johnson served as the creative head of Full Moon Entertainment label Alchemy Entertainment/Big City Pictures.  His credits as producer while there include Ragdoll, The Horrible Dr. Bones, Killjoy and The Vault.

Credits

Broadway
On the Twentieth Century (1978–1979)
Eubie! (1978–1979)
The Rink (1984)
Rap Master Ronnie (1984)
Big Deal (1986)
The Lion King (1997–present)
Hot Feet (2006)
Jekyll & Hyde (2013)
Kiss Me, Kate (2019)

Film
Eubie! (1981)
Off the Mark (1987)
American Blue Note (1989)
Murder by Numbers (1990)
Total Recall (1990)
Intimate Stranger (1991)
Hideous! (1997)
Archibald the Rainbow Painter (1998)
In the Shadow of the Cobra (2004)

As producer:
Ragdoll (1999)
The Horrible Dr. Bones (2000)
Killjoy (2000)
The Vault (2000)

Television
Gimme a Break! (1985)
The New Mike Hammer (1986)
My Two Dads (1988)
Police Story: The Watch Commander (1988)
Designing Women (1989)
Life Goes On (1989)
The Munsters Today (1991)
On the Air (1992)
The Fresh Prince of Bel-Air (1994)
New York Undercover (1997)
Liberty! The American Revolution (1997)
The Practice (1998)
Sunset Beach (1999)
Star Trek: Deep Space Nine (1999)
Sheena (2001)
Jessica Jones (2018)

Notes

External links
 
 Listen to Mel Johnson on Spotlight on Connecticut - Visit https://web.archive.org/web/20080315044829/http://spotlightonct.com/2_04_08_Mel_Johnson.html

African-American male actors
Year of birth missing (living people)
Living people
Place of birth missing (living people)
People from Long Island City, Queens